Tamar Murtem is an Indian politician from the state of Arunachal Pradesh.

Tamar was elected from Raga seat in the 2014 Arunachal Pradesh Legislative Assembly election, standing as an BJP candidate.

See also
Arunachal Pradesh Legislative Assembly

References

External links
Tamar Murtem profile
MyNeta Profile

Indian National Congress politicians
Living people
People's Party of Arunachal politicians
Arunachal Pradesh MLAs 2014–2019
Year of birth missing (living people)